Groovin' is the second album by Japanese singer Toshinobu Kubota, released on April 22, 1987. The album peaked at number 33 on the Oricon Album charts, and sold over a million copies, becoming a certified Million. Following the release of the album, Kubota went on "Keep On Dancing Tour", and later released the concert DVD Keep On Dancing.

Track listing
 Psychic Beat
 
 Place
 Randy Candy
 Lady Suicide
 
 
 
 
 Visions

References

1987 albums
Toshinobu Kubota albums
Sony Music albums